Grand Sport is a sports equipment manufacturing company based in Thailand. It was established in 1961.

Brands
 Grand Sport
 ONYX

Sponsorships

Grand Sport products have been accepted by recognized organization such as Asian Volleyball Confederation, Football Association of Singapore, Bahrain Football Association, Oman Football Association, Qatar Football Association, Kuwait Football Association, Uzbekistan Football Federation, Football Federation of Kyrgyz Republic, and Qatar, Oman, Vietnam Olympic Committee.  Grand Sport also provides various clubs with kits, such as Dhofar in Oman, and previously Qatar S.C. in Qatar. Now Grand Sport provides for Football Association of Thailand and the Sri Lanka Referees Association.

Olympic Committees

 2016 Summer Olympics
 2020 Summer Olympics
 Vietnam

Football

National Teams

Asian Football Confederation (AFC)

AFC current members 
 (Sea Games only)
 (Sea Games only)
 2014-
 2014-
 2014-

AFC former member (1992-2002) 
 1987-1997
 2019-2022
 1999 
 1992-1997
 1996-2005
 1997-2002 
 2006-2007 
 2011-2016
 1996-2000
 1998-1999
 2015-2021

Club teams

Asia 
 Tensung FC
 Army United 2006-2011
 Osotsapa 2008-2016
 PTT Rayong 2015
 Phuket 2010-2017
 PT Prachuap 
 Trat 2019-
 Chiangrai United 
 Chiangmai United 
 Phrae United
 Magway 2013-
 B.G. Sports Club 2014-
 TC Sports Club 2014-
 National Defense Ministry 2019-
 Can Tho
 Dong Thap 
 Gia Viet
 Hong Linh Ha Tinh
 Song Lam Nghe An

Associations 
Grand Sport is the Official ball supplier for the following leagues and associations:
 Thai League
 Lao League

Sepak Takraw 
 Thailand

Volleyball

Asia 
 Thailand

Futsal
 Thai Son Bac

References

External links
 

Thai brands
Shoe brands
Swimwear manufacturers
Sportswear brands
Clothing companies established in 1961
Shoe companies of Thailand
Manufacturing companies based in Bangkok
1961 establishments in Thailand
Sporting goods manufacturers of Thailand
Companies based in Bangkok
Sports companies
Companies of Thailand